Frederick Boyd may refer to:

Allen Boyd (Frederick Allen Boyd Jr., born 1945), American politician
Frederick Boyd (priest), Archdeacon of Winnipeg
Sir Frederick Boyd (1820–1889), 6th Baronet of the Boyd baronets

See also
Fred Boyd (disambiguation)
Mark Frederick Boyd (1889–1968), American bacteriologist
Boyd (surname)